This is a list of Christian media organizations.

Christian broadcasting

Christian film

Christian radio

Christian radio drama 

Christian radio dramas vary from the dramatic Unshackled! to the children's program Adventures in Odyssey.

Christian radio networks

Christian radio stations

Contemporary Christian music stations

United States 

 Air 1
 K-LOVE

United States, East 

 W209CF
 WAIR (FM)
 WAKL
 WAKW
 WALC
 WARX
 WAUF-LP
 WAWR
 WAWZ
 WAYF
 WAYH
 WAYK
 WAYL
 WBFN
 WBHY-FM
 WBRJ-LP
 WBYN-FM
 WCMD-FM
 WCOH
 WCQR-FM
 WCRJ
 WCSG
 WCVK
 WCVO
 WCZE
 WDCX (AM)
 WDJC-FM
 WDLG
 WDTR
 WEJC
 WELL-FM
 WERR
 WFEN
 WFIX
 WFRN-FM
 WGRW
 WHIF
 WHPD
 WHRX
 WHYT
 WIWA
 WIZB
 WJIA
 WJIS
 WJOG
 WJOH
 WJOJ
 WJOM
 WJOU
 WJQK
 WJTL
 WJVK
 WKPK
 WKTZ-FM
 WKVB
 WKVK
 WKVV
 WKVZ
 WLCQ-LP
 WLGH
 WLKB
 WLKU
 WLOM
 WLRY
 WLTK
 WLVE
 WLWX
 WMBJ
 WMHK
 WMLY-LP
 WMSL
 WMUZ-FM
 WNFA
 WNHG
 WNLR
 WNPQ
 WNWC-FM
 WOFM
 WOLR
 WORQ
 WPFF
 WPIR
 WPOZ
 WPRJ
 WRBS-FM
 WRCM
 WRPC-LP
 WSFP
 WSGG
 WSIS (FM)
 WSLI-FM
 WTAC
 WTLI
 WTXR
 WUFN
 WUGN
 WVBH (FM)
 WVFJ-FM
 WVMC-FM
 WVNI
 WVRV
 WWIP
 WWJD
 WWPN (FM)
 WYDA
 WYHA
 WYLV
 WYRA
 WYRV
 WYSZ
 WZLV

United States, West 

 KAAI
 KAFC
 KAGC
 KAIG
 KAJC
 KALS
 KANN
 KARO
 KBEF
 KBHL
 KBHN
 KBMQ
 KBMW-FM
 KBNV
 KCIR
 KCMM
 KCSP-FM
 KDNW
 KDOV
 KDUV
 KEAZ
 KFLO-FM
 KFNW-FM
 KFSI
 KGTN-LP
 KHPE
 KHRB-LP
 KHRT
 KICY-FM
 KJBN
 KJKL
 KJOL
 KJTH
 KJVA-LP
 KKEQ
 KKJM
 KKLC
 KKSP
 KLBE-LP
 KLBF
 KLDQ
 KLFF
 KLFV
 KLKA
 K-LOVE
 KLRX
 KLTY
 KLVH
 KLVU
 KMZL
 KMZO
 KNDR
 KNLR
 KNLX
 KNRB
 KNWA (AM)
 KOAR
 KPRT
 KPUL
 KRFF-LP
 KRLF
 KRRB
 KSGN
 KSOS
 KURS
 KVID
 KVKL
 KVLB
 KVMV
 KVNE
 KVRP (AM)
 KWND
 KWRC
 KXGM
 KYKV
 KYLV

Other 

 Heaven 97

Gospel music radio stations

United States, East 

 WACQ
 WAGF-FM
 WAGG
 WAGR (AM)
 WAMI (AM)
 WAMV
 WBGX
 WBHQ
 WBXB
 WCGL
 WCLN-FM
 WCPK
 WCPS
 WDJL
 WEAF (AM)
 WEAM-FM
 WECO (AM)
 WEHA
 WEOM-LP
 WEUP (AM)
 WEUV
 WEXY
 WFBM-LP
 WFDR (AM)
 WFPM-LP
 WFTH
 WGOK
 WGPL
 WGRB
 WHBB
 WHLW
 WHMA (AM)
 WIDU
 WIGN
 WIMG
 WKGT-LP
 WKZK
 WLLV
 WLPS-FM
 WMIR
 WNLA (AM)
 WNOO
 WOAD (AM)
 WONG
 WOOF (AM)
 WPCE
 WPFC (AM)
 WPZE
 WPZR
 WRBZ
 WRCS
 WREN (AM)
 WRJE
 WROS
 WSEL-FM
 WSOK
 WSTT
 WTQT-LP
 WTSK
 WTUA
 WTYS-FM
 WUAF-LP
 WUBR
 WVEL
 WVMB-LP
 WVTJ
 WWHN
 WXKD
 WXOK
 WXQW
 WXVI
 WYCA
 WYCV
 WYLS
 WYNN (AM)
 WZAZ

United States, West 

 KAGV
 KANI
 KBLK-LP
 KCWG-LP
 KHII
 KHVN
 KJIC
 KJTX
 KKNO
 KMFS
 KMTL
 KMVG
 KPSH
 KTKC
 KTLV
 KTTP
 KUDV

Southern Gospel radio stations

United States, East 

 WAVU
 WBBL
 WBIB
 WBOJ
 WBSA
 WBTG-FM
 WCIS
 WCTP
 WDTM
 WEIS (AM)
 WELB
 WELJ
 WEMM-FM
 WIRB
 WJBZ-FM
 WJEC (FM)
 WJLX
 WJTW
 WJYP
 WKAX
 WKJL
 WKNG-FM
 WKNV
 WKVG
 WLPR (AM)
 WMCJ
 WMDR-FM
 WMGY
 WOAY (AM)
 WOPP
 WOSM (FM)
 WOTR (FM)
 WPIL
 WPMR-LP
 WPOT
 WRJL-FM
 WSTK
 WTOF
 WUKZ
 WURL
 WVEM-LP
 WVOB
 WVSM
 WWGC
 WXJC (AM)
 WYDE-FM
 WYSN

United States, West 

 KAYH
 KCGS
 KCNP
 KCOM
 KETU
 KFLO-LP
 KGGM
 KIMY
 KLRG

Miscellaneous and unclassified Christian radio stations

United States 

 World Harvest Radio International

United States, East 

 WAFJ
 WAFR
 WAFS (AM)
 WAGP
 WAKD
 WALN
 WAPN
 WAPQ-LP
 WAQU
 WARV (AM)
 WAVA (AM)
 WAVA-FM
 WAWZ
 WAXU
 WAYE
 WBFR
 WBGL
 WBHY (AM)
 WBHZ
 WBIE
 WBMJ
 WBNH
 WBRI
 WBWG-LP
 WBXR
 WCCE
 WCCV (FM)
 WCGB
 WCGX
 WCHR (AM)
 WCIC
 WCOA-FM
 WCRF-FM
 WCRP
 WCRT (AM)
 WCUE
 WCUG
 WCVJ
 WCVV
 WCWV
 WDBW-LP
 WDER
 WDHP
 WDTK
 WDWR
 WDYF
 WEBT
 WEEC
 WEMB
 WETB
 WEVI
 WEZE
 WFAR
 WFAX
 WFCH
 WFCV
 WFFH
 WFFI
 WFGL
 WFHM-FM
 WFIA
 WFIL
 WFME-FM
 WFSH-FM
 WFSJ-LP
 WFSO
 WFSP (AM)
 WGAB
 WGEN-FM
 WGFC
 WGIB
 WGIV
 WGKA
 WGNB
 WGOD-FM
 WGRI
 WGTH (AM)
 WGTH-FM
 WGTK
 WGTK-FM
 WGUL
 WHAZ (AM)
 WHCB
 WHEY
 WHHV
 WHK
 WHKW
 WHKZ
 WHNQ
 WHPE-FM
 WHRZ-LP
 WHSL
 WIBI
 WIDA (AM)
 WIDA-FM
 WIGV-LP
 WIHR-LP
 WIHW-LP
 WIJD
 WIND (AM)
 WITA
 WITK
 WIVH
 WIVV
 WIXL-LP
 WJCH
 WJCK (FM)
 WJDA
 WJFM
 WJIF
 WJIV
 WJKL
 WJKN-FM
 WJKQ
 WJLZ
 WJNI (FM)
 WJRF
 WJSA-FM
 WJWD
 WJWT
 WJZU
 WKAL
 WKAT
 WKBA
 WKBH (AM)
 WKBO
 WKCL
 WKDI
 WKES
 WKFF
 WKGW
 WKJW
 WKRT
 WKVW
 WKWL
 WLBF
 WLFA
 WLFS
 WLJN
 WLJR
 WLNL
 WLPV-LP
 WLQV
 WLRM
 WLSD
 WLSS
 WLTA
 WLVA
 WMBV
 WMCA
 WMCC-LP
 WMCH
 WMDB
 WMHH
 WMHR
 WMKL
 WMKM
 WMQM
 WMSJ
 WMWK
 WNFR
 WNIV
 WNQM
 WNRG (AM)
 WNRT
 WNTP
 WNVA (AM)
 WNVM
 WNVY
 WNYJ-TV
 WNYM
 WNZR
 WOFN
 WOGR (AM)
 WORD-FM
 WORL
 WOTJ
 WPCL
 WPEL-FM
 WPIT
 WPJF
 WPJY
 WPLI
 WPPC
 WQRP
 WQSG
 WRAF
 WRAR (AM)
 WRDT
 WRFD
 WRMK-LP
 WROL
 WRVL
 WRYP
 WSAE
 WSEW
 WSIV
 WSJC
 WSJL
 WSKY (AM)
 WSSC (AM)
 WSTF (FM)
 WSTL
 WTBN
 WTGN
 WTGO-LP
 WTJC-LP
 WTJT
 WTLN
 WTLR
 WTMR
 WTPM (FM)
 WTRM
 WULR
 WUPC-LP
 WVBV
 WVNE
 WVOT
 WVRL
 WWBC
 WWCR
 WWDJ
 WWEV-FM
 WWFR
 WWIL-FM
 WWNL
 WWOS
 WWOW
 WWPC
 WWQT
 WWRB
 WWTC
 WWWC (AM)
 WXES
 WYAS
 WYBP
 WYBY
 WYEA
 WYFA
 WYFB
 WYFD
 WYFE
 WYFG
 WYFH
 WYFI
 WYFJ
 WYFK
 WYFL
 WYFO
 WYFQ
 WYFR
 WYFT
 WYFU
 WYFV
 WYFZ
 WYGE
 WYLL
 WYMM
 WYND (AM)
 WYQQ
 WYXE
 WYYC

United States, West 

 WZCP
 WZIQ
 WZJY
 WZND-LP
 WZOO (AM)
 WZWP
 WZXV
 KADI-FM
 KAGF-LP
 KAGT
 KAIM-FM
 KAKN
 KALD
 KAMB
 KAMI (AM)
 KANB-LP
 KANJ (FM)
 KANX
 KAOG
 KAQD
 KARG
 KARR (AM)
 KASA (AM)
 KAVS-LP
 KAWA
 KAXG
 KAYT
 KBBW
 KBDO
 KBGN
 KBHW
 KBIC
 KBIQ
 KBJD
 KBJQ
 KBJS
 KBLD
 KBNJ
 KBNL
 KBPU
 KBWA
 KBYR-FM
 KCAV
 KCBI
 KCBQ
 KCCE (AM)
 KCFO
 KCGR
 KCIC (FM)
 KCIS
 KCIV
 KCKY
 KCLM
 KCMH (FM)
 KCMI
 KCNW
 KCNZ-CD
 KCOV-LP
 KCPL
 KCRO
 KCTA
 KDAR
 KDAZ
 KDFC
 KDFR
 KDFT
 KDIA
 KDKR
 KDNI
 KDRY
 KDSO
 KEAR (AM)
 KEBR
 KECR
 KEFR
 KEKO (FM)
 KELP-FM
 KERI
 KFAX
 KFBN
 KFIA
 KFIS
 KFLB
 KFLQ
 KFLR-FM
 KFNW (AM)
 KFRD
 KFRN
 KFRW
 KFRY
 KFSA
 KFSG
 KFSH-FM
 KGBA (AM)
 KGBI-FM
 KGBN
 KGCL
 KGDP
 KGFT
 KGGR
 KGLE
 KGNR
 KGNW
 KGNZ
 KGU
 KGU-FM
 KHCM (AM)
 KHCM-FM
 KHCO
 KHIB
 KHMG
 KHNR
 KHOJ
 KHRI (FM)
 KHRW
 KHSA-LP
 KIBC
 KICY (AM)
 KIHW-LP
 KINE (AM)
 KIOU
 KIXL
 KJAT-LP
 KJCR
 KJNN-LP
 KJNP (AM)
 KJRF
 KJRT
 KJTY
 KJYE
 KKBT
 KKFS
 KKGM
 KKHT-FM
 KKLA-FM
 KKLL
 KKMC
 KKMS
 KKOL (AM)
 KKOL-FM
 KKRS
 KKVV
 KKXX (AM)
 KLAR
 KLBV
 KLDC
 KLDV
 KLDX
 KLFE
 KLFG
 KLHT
 KLHT-FM
 KLIT
 KLLV
 KLMP
 KLPF
 KLRD
 KLRY
 KLUP
 KLUU
 KLVL
 KLWG
 KLXD
 KLXP
 KLXV (FM)
 KLYT
 KLZV
 KMBI-FM
 KMEO
 KMOC
 KMRF
 KMSI
 KNEH-LP
 KNIS
 KNLB
 KNLS
 KNTH
 KNTS (AM)
 KNWC (AM)
 KNWC-FM
 KOHR
 KOKE-FM
 KOKF
 KORB
 KORE
 KOZR-LP
 KPAE
 KPDQ (AM)
 KPDQ-FM
 KPEZ
 KPFR
 KPGN-LP
 KPGT
 KPHF
 KPHL
 KPLL-LP
 KPOF
 KPRZ
 KPSZ
 KPXQ
 KQCV-FM
 KQFE
 KQPW-LP (defunct)
 KRDU
 KRIO-FM
 KRKS
 KRKS-FM
 KRLA
 KROA
 KRTM
 KRUC
 KRWA
 KRYP
 KSAC-FM
 KSAF-LP
 KSAI
 KSAO (FM)
 KSBS-FM
 KSDA-FM
 KSGL
 KSGR
 KSKY
 KSLM
 KSLR
 KSLT
 KSNY (AM)
 KSOU (AM)
 KSRI
 KSSQ-LP
 KSTL (AM)
 KTAA
 KTAD
 KTBA
 KTBN (shortwave)
 KTFY
 KTIE
 KTIS (AM)
 KTIS-FM
 KTKZ
 KTLI
 KTLW
 KTNO
 KTOL
 KTPF
 KTPJ-LP
 KTWD
 KTWG
 KTXG
 KUAU
 KUBJ
 KUDU
 KUFR
 KUMC-LP
 KUTR
 KUYO
 KVCE
 KVCY
 KVOH
 KVOZ
 KVRA
 KVSO
 KVTT
 KVVO-LP
 KWJC
 KWPZ
 KWRD-FM
 KWRG-LP
 KXBR
 KXEG
 KXRP
 KXWA
 KXXT
 KYCC
 KYCM
 KYFB
 KYFG
 KYFI
 KYFR
 KYFS
 KYFV
 KYKD
 KYMS
 KYYA
 KZJB
 KZKV
 KZLC-LP
 KZNT
 KZOI

United States and Canadian 

 EnLighten
 FamilyNet Radio
 FamilyTalk
 Praise (Sirius XM)
 Spirit (XM)
 The Message (Sirius XM)

Canadian 

 CFAQ-FM
 CFSH-FM
 CFWC-FM
 CHIC-FM
 CHJX-FM
 CHPV-FM
 CHRI-FM
 CHSB-FM
 CHVN-FM
 CIAJ-FM
 CIAM-FM
 CIAY-FM
 CIDV-FM
 CIHS-FM
 CILA-FM
 CINB-FM
 CINU-FM
 CIOG-FM
 CION-FM
 CIOT-FM
 CIRA-FM
 CITA-FM
 CIXN-FM
 CJCA
 CJCE-FM
 CJFH-FM
 CJFY-FM
 CJGY-FM
 CJIV-FM
 CJJC-FM
 CJLF-FM
 CJLI
 CJLT-FM
 CJLU-FM
 CJMB-FM
 CJOA-FM
 CJOS-FM (defunct)
 CJRF-FM
 CJRI-FM
 CJRY-FM
 CJSI-FM
 CJTK-FM
 CJTL-FM
 CJTW-FM
 CJYE
 CKGW-FM
 CKJJ-FM
 CKOE-FM
 CKOS-FM
 CKSO-FM
 CKVN-FM
 VF8016
 VOAR (AM)
 VOWR

Australian 

 1WAY
 2CBA
 3MGR
 Life FM (Adelaide)
 Life FM (Gippsland)
 Life FM (Gold Coast)
 Life FM (Wagga Wagga)
 Rhema FM 97.7
 Rhema FM Manning Great Lakes
 Rhema FM Newcastle
 Ultra106five

Philippines 

 DWAY
 DWCL
 DWEJ
 DWGV-AM
 DWSN
 DWXI
 DZAR
 DZAS
 DZEC
 DZEL
 DZEM
 DZFE
 DZJV
 DZME
 DZRH
 DZRJ-AM
 DZSP
 DZXL

Miscellaneous locations 

 Gospel 88.7
 HCJB
 Praise 87.9

Christian television

Christian television programs 

 The Sound Show

Christian television networks 

SAT-7 is a Christian satellite television organization based in Nicosia, Cyprus and broadcasting 24/7 in Arabic, Persian, and Turkish across 22 countries in the Middle East and North Africa, as well as 50 countries in Europe. Founded in 1995, SAT-7 is the first and largest Christian satellite organization serving the region. Terence Ascott, Founder, has served as International CEO from 1995 through 2019. His successor, Rita Elmounayer, joined SAT-7 in 1996 where she worked as a producer, writer, and was the first presenter on-screen when the network began broadcasting. She has served as the International CEO as of April 1, 2019. More than 80 percent of programming is produced in the Middle East by Middle Easterners. The network broadcasts "free to air" to viewers and as a nonprofit organization is supported financially by interested individuals from the region, Europe, Asia, and North America. In 2011, viewership was estimated at over 15 million.

Trinity Broadcasting Network TBN is the world's largest religious network and America's most watched faith channel. In 1973, Paul and Jan Crouch founded the network with the flagship show entitled "Praise the Lord". TBN offers 24 hours of commercial-free inspirational programming for Protestant, Catholic and Messianic Jewish denominations.  Programs are translated into numerous foreign languages at the International Production Center in Irving, Texas. Across America and around the world TBN is carried by TV stations and cable systems to millions of homes. As of 2012, TBN is featured on over 5,000 television stations, 33 satellites, the Internet and thousands of cable systems around the world.

Christian television stations 

 KDSO-LD

Christian music organizations

Christian music festivals 

 Agape Music Festival
 Alive Festival
 Big Boss' Festival
 BigChurchDayOut
 Black Stump Music and Arts Festival
 Christmas Rock Night
 Clover Festival
 Cornerstone Festival
 Cornerstone Florida
 Creation Fest
 Creation Festival
 Festival Con Dios
 Festival of Faith and Music
 Flevo Festival
 Freakstock
 The Gathering (Serious4God)
 Glory at the Gardens
 Greenbelt festival
 Harvest Crusade
 Ichthus Music Festival
 LifeLight Music Festival
 Lifest
 Maata Näkyvissä Festival
 Music in the Rockies
 Night of Joy
 Parachute music festival
 Praise
 Purple Door
 Revelation Generation
 Rock the Coast
 Rock the Desert
 Rock the Universe
 Seminole Sing
 ShoutFest
 Sonfest
 Songfest
 Sonshine Festival
 Soulfest
 Spirit West Coast
 TOMfest
 Unity Christian Music Festival
 Youth Conference (Christian)
 Youth Conference (Newfoundland)
 Youth of the Nation Conference

Christian music groups

Gospel musical groups

United States 

 BeBe & CeCe Winans
 Brooklyn Tabernacle Choir
 Charles and Taylor
 Commissioned
 Deep River Boys
 Doyle Lawson & Quicksilver
 Dynamic Praise
 Five Blind Boys of Mississippi
 God's Property
 Gold City
 Gospel Music Workshop of America
 Guy & Ralna
 Harlem Gospel Choir
 Imperial Golden Crown Harmonizers
 Kevin Davidson and The Voices
 Mary Mary
 Meditation Singers
 Mighty Clouds of Joy
 Mississippi Mass Choir
 Mitchell's Christian Singers
 One Nation Crew
 Out of Eden
 Pilgrim Travelers
 Ramiyah
 Saints Unified Voices
 Selah Jubilee Singers
 Sensational Nightingales
 Singing Americans
 Sounds of Blackness
 Swan Silvertones
 Sweet Honey in the Rock
 Sweet Inspirations
 Take 6
 The Arnolds
 The Blackwood Brothers
 The Blind Boys of Alabama
 The Caravans
 The Clark Sisters
 The Cockman Family
 The Crabb Family
 The Crownsmen
 The Davis Sisters
 The Dixie Hummingbirds
 The Drinkard Singers
 The FAMU Gospel Choir
 The Gabbards
 The Gospel Harmony Boys
 The Gospel Hummingbirds
 The Jody Brown Indian Family
 The Lee Boys
 The Lighthouse Boys
 The Make-Up
 The Marksmen
 The Martins
 The McKameys
 The Messengers Choir
 The Oak Ridge Boys
 The Original Soul Seekers
 The Philharmonics
 The Rambos
 The Roberta Martin Singers
 The Spiritual Harmonizers
 The Staple Singers
 The Stovall Sisters
 The Winans
 Thurman Ruth
 Total Experience Gospel Choir
 Trace Family Trio
 Trin-i-tee 5:7
 Virtue
 Wendy Bagwell and the Sunliters
 Winans family

Miscellaneous and unclassified 

 Almighty Defenders
 Chicago Mass Choir
 Choralerna
 Colorado Mass Choir
 Diante do Trono
 Dublin Gospel Choir
 Frisk Luft
 Georgia Mass Choir
 Gospel quartet
 L.A. Mass Choir
 London Community Gospel Choir
 Milele
 The Brown Singers
 The Cook Family Singers
 The Wades
 The Weatherfords
 Youthful Spirit

Gospel quartets 

 Golden Gate Quartet
 The Hinsons
 The Homeland Harmony Quartet
 Jubilee quartet
 Stamps Quartet
 The Statesmen Quartet
 The Soul Stirrers

Christian hip hop groups 

 116 Clique
 Basehead
 DC Talk
 Deepspace5
 GRITS
 Group 1 Crew
 LA Symphony
 Mars ILL
 Rapture Ruckus
 Souljahz
 Soul-Junk
 The Cross Movement

Christian heavy metal groups

United States 

 Aletheian (tech. metal)
 As Cities Burn (metalcore/post-hardcore)
 As I Lay Dying (metalcore)
 Barren Cross (power metal)
 Becoming the Archetype (tech. metal/ prog. metal)
 Corpus Christi (metalcore)
 Destroy the Runner (metalcore)
 Die Happy (power metal/hard rock)
 Disciple (alt. metal/hard rock)
 East West (nu-metal)
 Eternal Decision (death metal)
 Figure Four (metalcore)
 Guardian (power metal)
 Gwen Stacy (metalcore)
 Haven (power metal)
 Holy Soldier (power metal)
 I Am Terrified (metalcore/post-hardcore)
 Inhale Exhale (metalcore)
 Jacobs Dream (power metal)
 Joshua (power metal/hard rock)
 Kids in the Way (nu-metal/hard rock)
 Klank (industrial)
 Magdallan (power metal)
 Maylene and the Sons of Disaster (southern metal)
 Mortal Treason (deathcore/metalcore)
 Neon Cross (power metal)
 Oil (power metal)
 Once Dead (thrash metal)
 Peace of Mind (nu-metal)
 Philadelphia (power metal)
 Place of Skulls (doom metal)
 Point of Recognition (metalcore)
 Raid (metalcore)
 Remove the Veil (metalcore)
 Sacrament (thrash metal)
 Sacred Warrior (power metal)
 Saint (power metal)
 Saviour Machine (power metal)
 Sever Your Ties (metalcore/post-hardcore)
 Sinai Beach (metalcore)
 Since October (metalcore)
 SinDizzy (power metal)
 Six Feet Deep (metalcore/sludge metal)
 Sleeping Giant (metalcore)
 Soul Embraced (metalcore/death metal)
 Spitfire (mathcore)
 Stryken (power metal)
 Stryper (power metal)
 Temple of Blood (thrash metal)
 Terminal (metalcore/post-hardcore)
 The Chariot (metalcore/mathcore)
 Theocracy (power metal)
 Trenches (metalcore/sludge metal)
 Trytan (power metal)
 Twelve Gauge Valentine (metalcore/southern metal)
 Ultimatum (thrash metal)
 Whitecross (power metal)
 With Blood Comes Cleansing (deathcore)
 XDEATHSTARx (metalcore)
 XDISCIPLEx A.D. (metalcore)

Australia 

 Embodiment 12:14 (metalcore)
 Lightforce (power metal)
 Paramaecium (doom metal/death metal)
 Virgin Black (black metal)

Sweden, Finland and Norway 

 Audiovision (power metal)
 Blindside (nu-metal)
 Callisto (post-metal)
 Deuteronomium (death metal)
 Divinefire (power metal)
 Harmony (power metal)
 HB (power metal)
 Immortal Souls (death metal)
 Leviticus (power metal)
 Mehida (power metal)
 Narnia (power metal)
 Pantokrator (death metal)
 Sacrificium (death metal)
 Seventh Avenue (power metal)

Miscellaneous 

 2Tm2,3 (power metal)
 Altar (thrash metal)
 Ashen Mortality (doom metal)
 Balance of Power (power metal)
 Blood Covenant (symphonic metal)
 Mad Max (power metal/hard rock)
 Morphia (doom metal)
 Necromance (black metal)
 Oficina G3 (prog. metal)
 Opprobrium (death metal)
 Seventh Angel (thrash metal)
 Shout (power metal/hard rock)
 Tierra Santa (power metal/hard rock)
 XT (power metal)

Christian alternative metal groups

United States 

 Decyfer Down
 Demon Hunter
 Living Sacrifice
 Mortal
 Skillet
 The Crucified

Miscellaneous and unclassified 

 Argyle Park
 August Burns Red
 Blessthefall
 Burden of a Day
 Circle of Dust
 Embodyment
 Emery
 Flyleaf
 Haste the Day
 Kutless
 Norma Jean
 Oh, Sleeper
 One Bad Pig
 Seventh Day Slumber
 The Devil Wears Prada
 The Showdown
 Underoath

Christian extreme metal groups 

 Believer
 Bloodgood
 Bride
 Deliverance
 Eternal Mystery
 Impending Doom
 Mortification
 Tourniquet
 Vengeance Rising

Christian rapcore/nu metal groups 

 Every Day Life
 Pillar
 P.O.D.
 .rod laver
 TobyMac
 Travail

Unblack metal musical groups 

 Crimson Thorn
 Admonish
 Antestor
 Crimson Moonlight
 Drottnar
 Extol
 Frost Like Ashes
 Frosthardr
 Holy Blood
 Horde
 Lengsel
 Sanctifica
 Slechtvalk
 Vaakevandring

Christian rock groups

United States 

 Ace Troubleshooter
 AD
 Adam Again
 After the Chase
 Allies
 Attack Attack!
 BarlowGirl
 Basehead
 Breakfast with Amy
 Building 429
 Casting Crowns
 Chagall Guevara
 Chasen
 Consider the Thief
 Crumbächer
 Dear Ephesus
 DecembeRadio
 Esterlyn
 Fair
 Fireflight
 Foolish Things
 Future of Forestry
 Harvest
 High Flight Society
 Inhabited
 Ivoryline
 Life in Your Way
 Lost Dogs
 Lost Ocean
 Love Coma
 Love Song
 Mad at the World
 Mikeschair
 Mind Garage
 Number One Gun
 PAX217
 Petra
 Pivitplex
 Plumb
 Poor Old Lu
 Prodigal
 Project 86
 Red
 Remedy Drive
 Run Kid Run
 Ruscha
 Ruth
 Sevenglory
 Showbread
 Skillet
 Something Like Silas
 Spoken
 Squad Five-O
 Starflyer 59
 Stretch Arm Strong
 Sweet Comfort Band
 Switchfoot
 Tenth Avenue North
 The 77s
 The Ascendicate
 The Brothers Martin
 The Choir
 The Fold
 The Prayer Chain
 Thirty Pieces of Silver
 Twothirtyeight
 Watashi Wa
 Wavorly
 Widdlesworth
 Wrench in the Works

Canadian 

 Article One
 Blessed by a Broken Heart
 Critical Mass
 Cry of the Afflicted
 Dakona
 Daniel Band
 Downhere
 Drentch
 Hokus Pick
 Kiros
 Manic Drive
 Means
 Newworldson
 Ocean
 Salvation Air Force
 Secret and Whisper
 Starfield
 The Kry
 2nd Chapter of Acts
 33Miles
 38th Parallel

Miscellaneous and unclassified 

 A band called David
 Above the Golden State
 Across the Sky
 Addison Road
 After Edmund
 Alakrity
 Alisa
 All Together Separate
 Anberlin
 Anchordown
 Audio Adrenaline
 Barnabas
 Barratt Band
 Beanbag
 Between the Trees
 Between Thieves
 Big Daddy Weave
 Big Dismal
 Big Fil
 Big Tent Revival
 Black Carnation
 Bleach
 Blind
 Brave Saint Saturn
 Burlap to Cashmere
 By the Tree
 Charizma
 Chasing Furies
 Code of Ethics
 Common Children
 Cool Hand Luke
 Crash Rickshaw
 Dakoda Motor Co.
 Dale Thompson
 Daniel Amos
 David and the Giants
 Day of Fire
 Dead Artist Syndrome
 Dead Poetic
 DeGarmo and Key
 Delirious?
 Desperation Band
 DigHayZoose
 Disperse
 Dizmas
 Echoing Angels
 Eden's Bridge
 Eleventyseven
 Ever Stays Red
 Everlife
 Everman
 Falling Up
 Family Force 5
 Farrell and Farrell
 Fee
 Fighting Instinct
 FM Static
 Fono
 Forever Changed
 Further Seems Forever
 Glowin' Moses
 Grammatrain
 Grey Holiday
 Guerilla Rodeo
 Halo
 Hillsong United
 House of Heroes
 Idle Cure
 Jars of Clay
 Jerusalem
 Johnny Q. Public
 Jonah33
 Justifide
 Legend Seven
 Liberation Suite
 Liberty N' Justice
 Lifehouse
 LVL
 Mainstay
 Mastedon
 MewithoutYou
 Monday Morning
 Mu5tard
 My Spoon
 Nevertheless
 Newsboys
 Nickel Creek
 No Tagbacks
 Larry Norman
 Onehundredhours
 Out of the Grey
 Phil Keaggy
 Philmont
 Philmore
 Positive Infinity
 Puller
 Quench
 Ready for monday
 Reality Check
 Resurrection Band
 Revive
 Rhubarb
 Rock Productions Music
 Rocketboy
 Royal Empire Music
 Salvador
 Sanctus Real
 Seraph
 Servant
 Seven Day Jesus
 Seven Places
 Shaded Red
 Silage
 Sixpence None the Richer
 Slingshot 57
 Smalltown Poets
 Soulger
 Split Level
 Staple
 Stavesacre
 StorySide:B
 Strange Celebrity
 Subseven
 Superhero
 Tait
 The Afters
 The Fray
 The Glorious Unseen
 The Listening
 The Myriad
 The Send
 The Swirling Eddies
 The Vine Band
 Third Day
 Thirty Pieces of Silver
 Three Crosses
 VOTA
 White Heart
 X-Sinner
 YFriday
 ZOEgirl

Christian pop groups 

 Aurora
 Cadia
 FFH
 Jesus Loves You
 LaRue
 Leeland
 Point of Grace
 SHINEmk
 V*Enna
 Whisper Loud

Christian punk music groups 

 All Left Out
 Altar Boys
 Armia
 Ballydowse
 Blaster the Rocket Man
 Born Blind
 Calibretto 13
 Children 18:3
 Craig's Brother
 Crashdog
 Dogwood
 Everyday Sunday
 Flatfoot 56
 Ghoti Hook
 Glen Meadmore
 Halo Friendlies
 Hawk Nelson
 Headnoise
 Jesse & The Rockers
 Last Tuesday
 Left Out
 Letter Kills
 Lifesavers Underground
 Lugnut
 Lust Control
 MxPx
 Ninety Pound Wuss
 Officer Negative
 Pocket Change
 Raft of Dead Monkeys
 Relient K
 Roper
 Scaterd Few
 Side Walk Slam
 Slick Shoes
 Spy Glass Blue
 Stellar Kart
 Superchick
 The Blamed
 The Deadlines
 The Huntingtons
 The Undecided
 The Wedding
 This Beautiful Republic
 Undercover

Christian ska groups 

 The Insyderz
 Denver and the Mile High Orchestra
 Five Iron Frenzy
 Sonseed
 Sounds Like Chicken
 The Deluxtone Rockets
 The O.C. Supertones
 The W's

Miscellaneous and unclassified Christian music groups

United States 

 4Him
 Aaron Jeoffrey
 Acappella
 All Saved Freak Band
 All Star United
 Anointed
 ApologetiX
 The Archers
 Avalon
 AVB
 Bash-n-the-Code
 Bebo Norman
 Before Their Eyes
 Bethlehem
 Caedmon's Call
 Candle
 Cathedral Quartet
 Chandler
 Chasing Victory
 Children of the Day
 Chris and Conrad
 Christafari
 The Chuck Wagon Gang
 Cloud2Ground
 David Crowder Band
 Debby Kerner & Ernie Rettino
 Deitiphobia
 Delta-S
 Dime Store Prophets
 Dryve
 Eager
 Earthsuit
 East to West
 Echo Hollow
 The Echoing Green
 Ernie Haase & Signature Sound
 The Fairfield Four
 Gaither Vocal Band
 Gateway Worship
 Gentle Faith
 Ilia
 The Imperials
 The Innocence Mission
 Jacob's Trouble
 Jimmy Needham
 The Jordanaires
 Jump5
 Karen Peck and New River
 The Katinas
 Kingdom Heirs
 Kingsmen Quartet
 Koinonia
 Legacy Five
 Massivivid
 MercyMe
 Mercy's Mark Quartet
 Monk & Neagle
 My Brother's Mother
 NewSong
 Octappella
 PFR
 Phillips, Craig and Dean
 Plus One
 Pocket Full of Rocks
 PowerSource
 Psalm 150
 PureNRG
 A Ragamuffin Band
 Raze
 Rescue
 Roadside Monument
 Robbie Seay Band
 Rock n Roll Worship Circus
 Rush of Fools
 Selah
 Shane & Shane
 Sonicflood
 Speer Family
 Telecast
 Triumphant Quartet
 Valor
 Waterdeep
 The Way
 Worth Dying for
 Yum Yum Children

Miscellaneous 

 Aradhna
 The HiMiG Gospel Singers
 The Miscellaneous
 Zeichen der Zeit

Australia 

 Alabaster Box
 Kindekrist
 Planetshakers

British 

 After the Fire
 Fat and Frantic
 Iona
 The Joystrings
 Millennium Youth Choir
 Nutshell
 Phatfish
 The Tribe

Canadian 

 Carried Away
 Deliverance
 Parker Trio

South African 

 The Benjamin Gate
 Tree63

Swedish 

 Edin-Ådahl
 Jerusalem
 Ultrabeat
 Walk on Water

Christian record labels

Christian publishers

Christian book publishers 

 Abingdon Press
 American Christian Press
 Andrews University Press
 Augsburg Fortress
 Ave Maria Press
 Baker Publishing Group
 Banner of Truth Trust
 Baronius Press
 Benziger Brothers
 Bethany House
 BJU Press
 Bookcraft
 Brethren Missionary Herald Company (BMH)
 Burns & Oates
 Chick Publications Inc.
 Cluster Publications
 Committee of General Literature and Education
 Deseret Book
 DeVore & Sons Inc.
 Evangelical Christian Publishers Association
 Evangelical Press
 Gospel Light
 Grace Evangelical Society
 Harvest House
 Herald House
 Hodder & Stoughton
 Holman Bible Publishers
 Howard Books
 Inter-Varsity Press
 Lion Hudson
 Living Stream Ministry
 Lutterworth Press
 Mars Hill Audio
 Master Books
 Média-Participations
 Moody Publishers
 Nazarene Publishing House
 Northwestern Publishing House
 OMF International
 Orbis Books
 Pacific Press Publishing Association
 Paternoster Press
 Randall House Publications
 Regions Beyond Missionary Union
 Religious Tract Society
 Review and Herald Publishing Association
 Saint Austin Press
 Signs Publishing Company
 Society for Promoting Christian Knowledge
 TAN Books & Publishers
 Tate Publishing & Enterprises
 The Good Book Company
 Thomas Nelson
 Tyndale House
 Verlag Der Strom
 Walk Thru the Bible
 Westminster John Knox
 Whitaker House
 William B. Eerdmans Publishing Company
 Zondervan

Christian magazines, newspapers, and other periodicals 

 7ball
 America (magazine)
 Andrews University Seminary Studies
 The Briefing
 CCM Magazine
 The Children's Friend
 Charisma Magazine
 Chrismon
 The Christian Century
 Christian Marketplace
 The Christian Post
 Christianity Magazine
 Christianity Today
 Cornerstone
 Daerpies Dierie
 The Dawn
 Eternity
 English Churchman
 Evangelical Times
 FaithTalk
 Faithworks Magazine
 Focus
 Geist und Leben
 Gospel Advocate
 The Gospel Magazine
 Gospel Standard
 HM
 Homiletic and Pastoral Review
 House to House Heart to Heart
 Ignite Your Faith
 Investigate
 The Ladies' Repository
 Magazinet
 Ministry
 Monthly Repository
 Needed Truth Magazine
 The New Creation
 New Man
 Nuestro Pan Diario
 Our Daily Bread
 Outreach Magazine
 Pastoral Bible Institute
 The Philadelphia Trumpet
 The Plain Truth
 Plugged In
 Present Truth Magazine
 The Progressive Christian
 Rays from the Rose Cross
 RBC Ministries
 Record
 Reform
 Relevant Magazine
 Salvo
 Send!
 Signs of the Times (Australia)
 Signs of the Times
 Singing News
 Sojourners Magazine
 Spectrum
 The Sword of the Lord
 The Vine
 Third Way Magazine
 Touchstone Magazine
 True Tunes News
 Union of Catholic Asian News
 World
 Zeitschrift für die Alttestamentliche Wissenschaft
 Zeitschrift für die Neutestamentliche Wissenschaft

Miscellaneous and unclassified Christian publishers 

 American Tract Society
 Carey Press
 Salem Publishing
 Koorong

Christian bookstores 
 Adventist Book Center
 Berean Christian Stores
 Family Christian Stores
 Reformers Bookshop

See also

References 

Media organizations